On 22 March 2017, at approximately 4:30 a.m, a series of bomb blasts occurred in three locations in the Muna Garage area of Maiduguri, Borno State, northeastern Nigeria. The blasts occurred at the Muna Garage internally displaced persons (IDPs) camp.

The attacks, which were unleashed by three to five bombers at different locations, resulted in the deaths of three to five civilian camp residents as well as themselves - and injured 20 people.

No terrorist group claimed responsibility for the explosions, but jihadist insurgent group Boko Haram - who attacked Maiduguri many times before - are believed to be responsible.

References

2017 murders in Nigeria
2010s in Borno State 
21st century in Maiduguri
Boko Haram bombings
Crime in Maiduguri
Islamic terrorist incidents in 2017
March 2017 crimes in Africa
March 2017 events in Africa
Suicide bombings in 2017
Suicide bombings in Nigeria
Terrorist incidents in Nigeria in 2017